Alan Mycroft is a professor at the Computer Laboratory, University of Cambridge and a Fellow of Robinson College, Cambridge, where he is also director of studies for computer science.

Education 
Mycroft read mathematics at Cambridge then moved to Edinburgh where he completed his Doctor of Philosophy degree with a thesis on Abstract interpretation and optimising transformations for applicative programs supervised by Rod Burstall and Robin Milner.

Research 
Mycroft's research interests are in programming languages, software engineering and algorithms.

With Arthur Norman, he co-created the Norcroft C compiler. He is also a named trustee of the Raspberry Pi Foundation, a charitable organisation whose single-board computer is intended to stimulate the teaching of basic computer science in schools.

Personal life 
Mycroft has four children.

References 

Living people
British computer scientists
Fellows of Robinson College, Cambridge
Alumni of the University of Edinburgh
Year of birth missing (living people)